Hummingbird bush is a colloquial name and may refer to:

Anisacanthus quadrifidus, a plant in the family Acanthaceae
Grevillea thelemanniana, a plant in the family Proteaceae
Hamelia patens, a plant in the family Rubiaceae
Justicia californica, a plant in the family Acanthaceae

Plant common name disambiguation pages